The 2020 Weber State Wildcats football team represented Weber State University in the 2020–21 NCAA Division I FCS football season. The Wildcats were led by seventh-year head coach Jay Hill and played their games at Stewart Stadium as members of the Big Sky Conference.

Previous season

They finished the 2019 season 11–4, 7–1 in Big Sky play to finish in a two-way tie for the Big Sky championship with Sacramento State. They received the Big Sky's automatic bid to the FCS Playoffs where, after a first round bye, they defeated Kennesaw State in the second round and Montana in the quarterfinals before losing to James Madison in the semifinals.

Preseason

Polls
On July 23, 2020, during the virtual Big Sky Kickoff, the Wildcats were predicted to finish first in the Big Sky by both the coaches and media.

Schedule

References

Weber State
Weber State Wildcats football seasons
Big Sky Conference football champion seasons
Weber State
Weber State Wildcats football